is a Japanese politician who serves in the House of Representatives of the Diet (national legislature) as a member of the Liberal Democratic Party.

Career
A native of Kurokawa District, Miyagi, Doi graduated the Tohoku Gakuin University School of Law in 1981.

After having served in the local assembly of Miyagi Prefecture (won in 1993, 1995, 1999, lost in 2003), Doi was elected to the Diet for the first time in 2005.

Positions

Revisionism
Affiliated to the openly revisionist lobby Nippon Kaigi, that advocates a restoration of monarchy, and State Shinto in Japan, Doi often follows their agenda:
he was among the 86 parliamentarians attending their March 7, 2006 meeting to promote the Imperial tradition
he was among the lawmakers who signed 'THE FACTS', an ad published in The Washington Post on June 14, 2007, in order to protest against United States House of Representatives House Resolution 121, and to deny the existence of sexual slavery for the Imperial military ('Comfort women'). 
he is in favor of the revision of the Murayama Statement and Kono Statement
he is in favor of visits by a Prime Minister to the controversial Yasukuni Shrine
he is in favor of the revision of Article 9
he is a member of the following right-wing Diet groups: 
Conference of parliamentarians on the Shinto Association of Spiritual Leadership (神道政治連盟国会議員懇談会 - Shinto Seiji Renmei Kokkai Giin Kondankai) - NB: SAS a.k.a. Sinseiren, Shinto Political League
Nippon Kaigi Diet discussion group (日本会議国会議員懇談会 - Nippon kaigi kokkai giin kondankai)

Answers to Mainichi polls
Doi gave the following answers to the questionnaires submitted by Mainichi to candidates in 2012 and 2014:

In 2012
His answers were:
in favor of the revision of the Constitution
in favor of the right of collective self-defense (revision of Article 9)
in favor of the reform of the National assembly (unicameral instead of bicameral)
no answer regarding the reactivation of nuclear power plants
against the goal of zero nuclear power by 2030s
in favor of the relocation of Marine Corps Air Station Futenma (Okinawa)
in favor of evaluating the purchase of Senkaku Islands by the Government
in favor of a strong attitude versus China
against the participation of Japan to the Trans-Pacific Partnership
against a nuclear-armed Japan
in favor of the reform of the Imperial Household that would allow women to retain their Imperial status even after marriage

In 2014
His answers were:
in favor of the revision of the Article 9 of the Japanese Constitution
in favor of the right of collective self-defense
no answer regarding nuclear plants
no problem for visits of a Prime Minister to the controversial Yasukuni Shrine
in favor of the revision of the Murayama Statement
 in favor of the revision of the Kono Statement
no answer regarding laws preventing hate speech
no answer regarding question whether Marine Corps Air Station Futenma is a burden for Okinawa
in favor of the Special Secrecy Law
in favor of teaching 'morality' in school

References

External links 
  in Japanese.

Members of the House of Representatives (Japan)
Koizumi Children
Politicians from Miyagi Prefecture
Living people
Members of Nippon Kaigi
1958 births
Liberal Democratic Party (Japan) politicians